Todacheene Lake (Navajo: tó dích'íi'nii, meaning "bitter water") is a small lake in the crater of the Narbona Pass volcano, in San Juan County, New Mexico, within the Navajo Nation.

The lake has been stocked with rainbow trout.
Todacheene Lake and Aspen, Berland and Toadlena lakes are designated for recreational use in the Shiprock area.

References
Citations

Sources

 

Lakes of New Mexico
Bodies of water of San Juan County, New Mexico